Rephlexions! An Album of Braindance! is a 2003 compilation album released by Rephlex Records.

Critical reception
Heidi Chapson of Exclaim! said, "From electro to Squarepusher-esque drum & bass antics to melodic avant-gardism, the scope on this 19-track compilation is broad but cohesive, all presented in a timeless fashion." Dave Segal of Stylus Magazine gave the album a grade of B+, saying, "Rephlex remains one of the world's quirkiest and most inquisitive labels." Heath K. Hignight of XLR8R commented that "Bochum Welt's 'Radiopropulsive' and Yee-King's 'Goodnight Toby' are perfect examples of the Rephlex sound: a warp of perky melody and punchy acid feel that is at once culturally avant garde and musically retro."

Track listing

References

External links
 
 

2003 compilation albums
Rephlex Records compilation albums
Record label compilation albums
Electronic compilation albums